Salkuyeh may refer to:
 Bala Salkuyeh
 Pain Salkuyeh